Vinabayesius is a genus of hubbardiid short-tailed whipscorpions, first described by Teruel & Rodriguez-Cabrera in 2021.

Species 
, the World Schizomida Catalog accepts the following three species:

 Vinabayesius arenicola (Teruel, Armas & Rodríguez, 2012) – Cuba
 Vinabayesius digitiger (Dumitresco, 1977) – Cuba
 Vinabayesius naranjoi Teruel & Rodriguez-Cabrera, 2021 – Cuba

References 

Schizomida genera